María del Pilar Pereyra (born January 24, 1978) is a retired female butterfly and freestyle swimmer from Argentina who represented her native country twice at the Summer Olympics, in 1996 and 2000. She claimed the bronze medal in the Women's 200m Butterfly event at the 1995 Pan American Games.

References

External links
 

1978 births
Living people
Argentine female swimmers
Argentine female butterfly swimmers
Argentine female freestyle swimmers
Olympic swimmers of Argentina
Swimmers at the 1995 Pan American Games
Swimmers at the 1996 Summer Olympics
Swimmers at the 1999 Pan American Games
Swimmers at the 2000 Summer Olympics
Pan American Games bronze medalists for Argentina
Pan American Games medalists in swimming
Medalists at the 1995 Pan American Games
20th-century Argentine women